WFC Ateks Kyiv is a Ukrainian women's football club from Kyiv. The club plays in the First tier.

The club was formed in 2002 as CSK HPZhU (Central Sports Club of the Civil parliament of Ukrainian women) with a head coach Volodymyr Husar. Later that year he was changed by Alla Hres. Next year in 2003 the club became Ateks.

The club cooperates with a Kyiv sports school #16 and is referred to as Ateks-Special Sports School #16.

Due to financial difficulties, in 2008 the club did not participate in competitions.

References

External links
Official website
Ateks at UEFA
Hello, Ateks! (Здравствуй, АТЕКС! + фото). WFC Donchanka Donetsk. 6 June 2012
 Yaroslava Volvach. In sports there is no difference, boys or girls, a coach of the single football club out of Kyiv (В спорте нет разницы, мальчики или девочки — тренер единственного женского футбольного клуба Киева). Povaha. 16 July 2018

Women's football clubs in Ukraine
Association football clubs established in 2002
Football clubs in Kyiv
Ukrainian Women's League clubs
2002 establishments in Ukraine